Imerintsiatosika is a municipality in Madagascar. It belongs to the district of Arivonimamo, which is a part of Itasy Region. It is localized at 30 km west from the capital of Antananarivo on the National Road No.1. The population of the commune was estimated to be 69,953 in a 2019.

36 fokontany (villages) belong to this municipality.

Primary and junior level secondary education are available in town. The majority 98% of the population of the commune are farmers, while an additional 1% receives their livelihood from raising livestock. The most important crop is rice, while other important products are vegetables, cassava and potatoes. Services provide employment for 1% of the population.

There is a  radio station near Imeritsitosika. It belonged formerly to the NASA.

In 2021 a prison of high security was inaugurated in Imeritsitosika.

Rivers
The only river of the municipality is the Katsaoka that traverses it over a length of 12 km.

Archeological sites

The Rova Antongona and royal tomb, 6 km north of Imerintsiatosika.

References 

Populated places in Itasy Region